The men's marathon event at the 1983 Pan American Games was held in Caracas, Venezuela on 28 August.

Results

References

Athletics at the 1983 Pan American Games
1983
Panamerican
1983 Panamerican Games